Small Constitution (or Little Constitution) can refer to three constitutions of Poland:
 Small Constitution of 1919
 Small Constitution of 1947
 Small Constitution of 1992